Oxford Park may refer to:
Oxford Park, Montreal, a park in the Notre-Dame-de-Grâce district in Montreal
Oxford Park railway station, a stop on the Ferny Grove Line of Brisbane, Australia.
Oxford parks, parks and gardens in Oxford, England